The 39th Military Airlift Squadron is an inactive United States Air Force unit.  Its last was assigned to the 436th Military Airlift Wing, Military Airlift Command, stationed at Dover Air Force Base, Delaware.  It was inactivated on 31 March 1971.

History
Activated in 1942 to ferry newly manufactured combat aircraft to combat units deployed overseas.   Primarily flew B-25 and B-26 medium bombers to Southwest Pacific Area, however also ferried aircraft to Africa for units assigned to the North African Campaign and European Theater of Operations.    Inactivated in October 1943 during realignment of Ferrying Command to Air Transport Command.

Reactivated in 1954 under Military Air Transport Service, operated Douglas C-54 Skymaster aircraft on a worldwide scale from Dover Air Force Base, Delaware.    Upgraded to Douglas C-133 Cargomaster heavy-lift strategic transports in 1957, and continued global strategic airlift operations.   Reassigned to Military Airlift Command (MAC) in 1966 after inactivation of MATS, continued operations until retirement of C-133s in 1971 then inactivated.

Lineage
 Constituted as the 39th Air Corps Ferrying Squadron on 9 July 1942
 Activated on 28 July 1942
 Redesignated 39th Transport Squadron on 24 March 1943
 Disbanded on 18 October 1943
 Reconstituted and redesignated 39th Air Transport Squadron, Medium on 4 November 1953
 Activated on 16 February 1954
 Redesignated 39th Air Transport Squadron, Heavy on 8 September 1957
 Redesignated 39th Military Airlift Squadron on 8 January 1966
 Inactivated on 31 March 1971

Assignments
 11th Ferrying Group, 28 July 1942
 19th Ferrying Group, 1 November 1942 – 18 October 1943
 1607th Air Transport Group, 16 February 1954
 1607th Air Transport Wing, 18 January 1963
 436th Military Airlift Wing, 6 January 1966 – 31 March 1971

Stations
 Hamilton Field, California, 28 July 1942
 Hickam Field, Hawaii, 25 January 1943 – 18 October 1943
 Dover Air Force Base, Delaware, 16 February 1954 – 31 March 1971

Aircraft
 Primarily ferrying B-25 Mitchell and B-26 Marauder, 1942–1943.
 Douglas C-54 Skymaster, 1954–1957
 Douglas C-133 Cargomaster, 1957–1971

References

Notes
 Explanatory notes

 Citations

Bibliography

 
 
 
 
 Remembering an Unsung Giant The Douglas C-133 Cargomaster and Its People
 AFHRA document search

039
Military units and formations in Delaware
Military units and formations disestablished in 1971